Matevž Krumpestar (born 23 December 1977) is a Slovenian archer. He competed in the men's individual and team events at the 1996 Summer Olympics.

References

1977 births
Living people
Slovenian male archers
Olympic archers of Slovenia
Archers at the 1996 Summer Olympics
People from Kamnik